Bangladesh women's national under-20 football team represents Bangladesh in international football competitions for players under the age of 20. The team competes in the FIFA U-20 Women's World Cup, AFC U-19 Women's Championship as well as SAFF U-18 Women's Championship.

Team image

Home stadium
The Bangladesh women's national under-20 football team plays their home matches on the Bangabandhu National Stadium.

Results and fixtures
legend

Since 2006 to present day all matches results are updated below in the table.

2006

2010

2012

2018

2019

2021

2022

2023

Players

Current squad
 The following players were called up for 2019 Bangamata U-19 Women's Gold Cup on 19 April 2019.

Captains

Mishrat Jahan Moushumi (2016–)

Coaching staff

Current coaching staff

Competitive record

FIFA U-20 Women's World Cup

*Draws include knock-out matches decided on penalty kicks.

AFC U-20 Women's Asian Cup

*Draws include knock-out matches decided on penalty kicks.

AFC U-20 Women's Asian Cup qualification

SAFF U-18 Women's Championship

*Draws include knock-out matches decided on penalty kicks.

Honours

SAFF U-18 Women's Championship
Champion (3): 2018, 2021, 2023
Bangamata U-19 Women's International Gold Cup
Champion trophy shared (1): 2019

See also
Sport in Bangladesh
Football in Bangladesh
Women's football in Bangladesh

Bangladesh women's national football team
Bangladesh women's national under-17 football team
Bangladesh national football team
Bangladesh national under-20 football team
Bangladesh national under-17 football team

References

under-20
Asian women's national under-20 association football teams
under-20
Women's under-20